Momir Kecman (December 10, 1940, Krnja Jela, Bosanski Petrovac, Bosna i Hercegovina) is a Serbian former wrestler who competed in the 1972 Summer Olympics.

References

External links
 

1940 births
Living people
Serbian male sport wrestlers
Olympic wrestlers of Yugoslavia
Wrestlers at the 1972 Summer Olympics
Yugoslav male sport wrestlers
Serbs of Bosnia and Herzegovina
World Wrestling Championships medalists
Mediterranean Games silver medalists for Yugoslavia
Competitors at the 1971 Mediterranean Games
Mediterranean Games medalists in wrestling
European Wrestling Championships medalists
People from Bosanski Petrovac